Vera Szemere (born Seligmann 6 August 1923 – 3 April 1995) was a Hungarian actress.

Selected filmography
 Gyávaság (1942)
 Changing the Guard (1942)
 Liliomfi (1956)
 Pillar of Salt (1958)
 Story of My Foolishness (1966)
 Kárpáthy Zoltán (1966)
 Temporary Cloudiness (1967)
 Stars of Eger (1968)
 Alfa Romeó és Júlia (1969)

External links

1923 births
1995 deaths
Hungarian film actresses
Hungarian stage actresses
Hungarian television actresses
Actresses from Budapest
20th-century Hungarian actresses